Mix is a surname. Notable people with the surname include:

 Art Mix (1896 – 1972), American character actor
 Bryant Mix (born 1972), American football player
 Charles Eli Mix (1810–1878), American civil servant
 E. Townsend Mix (1831–1890), American architect
 Erich Mix (1898–1971), German politician
 Ron Mix (born 1938), American All-Pro Hall of Fame football player
 Ruth Mix (1912–1977), American B-movie actress; daughter of Tom Mix (see below)
 Steve Mix (born 1947), American usher and former National Basketball Association player and women's collegiate basketball coach
 Tom Mix (1880–1940), American film actor
 Walter Mix (1917–2004), highly decorated German World War II officer